Qi Wannian (died 299), or Qiwannian, was an ethnic Di chieftain and rebel leader during the Western Jin dynasty of China. In 296, he became leader of a tribal uprising against Jin in Qinzhou and Yongzhou that lasted until 299. The rebellion raised concerns among some ministers regarding the tension between the Han and tribal people while also triggering a mass migration of refugees into present-day southern Gansu and Sichuan.

Prelude 
During the late Han dynasty and Cao Wei period, many tribal ethnic groups migrated and settled in the Guanzhong region. However, various factors have led these groups to revolt during the Western Jin dynasty. In 270, the Xianbei chieftain, Tufa Shujineng, led a rebellion in Liangzhou, Yongzhou and Qinzhou involving numerous different tribes against Jin, but he was eventually defeated in 279.

In 294, a Xiongnu leader named He San (郝散) rebelled. His reason was due to poor governance under Sima Lun, who was the Chief Controller of Qinzhou and Yongzhou at the time, along with a nation-wide famine that was taking place. He took Shangdang and killed the Chief Clerk of the commandery, but in autumn of the same year, he decided to surrender back to Jin. However, after giving himself up, an unnamed Commandant of Pingyi had him executed.

He San had a younger brother named He Duyuan (郝度元). In the summer of 296, Duyuan allied himself with the Qiang people of Mount Malan (馬蘭山) in Beidi Commandery (北地, roughly modern Tongchuan, Shaanxi) together with the Lushui tribes (盧水胡). They killed the Administrator of Beidi, Zhang Sun (張損), and routed the Administrator of Pingyi, Ouyang Jian. The He brother's revolts led to Sima Lun being recalled to Luoyang while Sima Rong (司馬肜) was appointed to replace him.

Qi Wannian's Uprising 
In autumn of 296, the rebellion intensified after He Duyuan defeated the Inspector of Yongzhou, Hai Xi (解系). His victory inspired many of the Qiang and Di tribe in Qinzhou and Yongzhou to take up arms as well. Soon, the rebels elected a Di leader named Qi Wannian to be their Emperor before besieging Jingyang. In response, Jin ordered Xiahou Jun (夏侯駿) with Zhou Chu and Lu Bo (盧播) under his wing to quell the revolt. Qi Wannian was specifically worried about facing Zhou Chu, due to his esteemed reputation as a capable administrator and general, but he was confident that the rebels could beat him if he was restrained by someone's control. Coincidentally, another famine had struck the Guanzhong region, followed by a plague.

At the beginning of 297, Qi Wannian camped his forces at Mount Liang (梁山, in modern-day Qian County, Shaanxi) and amassed a huge force of 70,000 men. Zhou Chu was only given 5,000 men to attack the rebels, so he advised against this decision. Sima Rong and Xiahou Jun ignored his warning and forced him to go. Together with Lu Bo and Hai Xi, Zhou Chu attacked the rebels at Liumo (六陌, in modern-day Qian County, Shaanxi), where he and his soldiers made a famous last stand. Another famine occurred in Qinzhou and Yongzhou that year, once more followed by plague. Food had become so scarce that the price for ten pecks of rice rose to ten thousand in cash. The famine persisted into the following year, and it was around this time when many in the two provinces decided to migrate south into Yizhou.

The court eventually grew frustrated with Sima Rong's ineffectiveness. In 298, Zhang Hua and Chen Zhun (陳準) charged Sima Rong and Sima Lun with negligence of military affairs in Guanzhong. A general named Meng Guan was sent in instead to replace them and put an end to the rebellion once and for all. Meng Guan was more dedicated in his work, personally leading the campaigns against the rebels and consistently routing them. At the beginning of 299, Meng Guan fought Qi Wannian at Zhongting (中亭, west of present-day Wugong, Shaanxi). Meng defeated the Di army and killed Qi Wannian, ending the four-year-long rebellion.

Aftermath 
The rebellion raised some concerns regarding the coexistence between the Han Chinese and tribal people. One minister, Jiang Tong, because of the rebellion, wrote an essay titled "Discussion on Relocating the Rong Tribes (徙戎論)" which he submitted to the Jin court, warning them about the threat possessed by the tribes to the dynasty. The Di states of Chouchi and Cheng Han were also established by refugee leaders displaced by Qi Wannian's rebellion.

References 

 Fang, Xuanling (ed.) (648). Book of Jin (Jin Shu).
 Sima, Guang (1084). Zizhi Tongjian.

Jin dynasty (266–420)
Year of birth unknown
299 deaths
Jin dynasty (266–420) people killed in action